NIU College of Engineering and Engineering Technology (NIU CEET) was established in 1985 and offers ABET and ATMAE accredited programs in engineering and engineering technology. The college offers degree programs in electrical engineering, mechanical engineering, industrial and systems engineering, engineering technology, and industrial technology.

History 
Established in 1985, the NIU College of Engineering and Engineering Technology is the youngest college on the Northern Illinois University (NIU) campus. CEET enrollment has increased every year despite a decrease in national enrollments.

In June 2016, the NIU College of Engineering and Engineering Technology announced Omar A. Ghrayeb, Ph.D as interim dean, effective June 30.

Departments 
Electrical Engineering
Industrial and Systems Engineering
Mechanical Engineering
Technology

Research 
CEET faculty are engaged in a broad array of research sponsored by private industry and agencies such as:
 National Science Foundation
 Fermi National Accelerator Laboratory
 Argonne National Laboratory
 National Institute of Standards and Technology
 State of Illinois

Ongoing research addresses issues in Homeland Security, energy and environment, lean manufacturing, active noise and vibration control, supply chain management, biodegradable products, P-20, computational engineering, biomedical engineering, nanoscience, health systems engineering, wireless communications, power electronics, radio frequency, mechatronics, computational fluid dynamics, and more.

Facilities 
Engineering Building: The main NIU College of Engineering and Engineering Technology building is designed to teach students concepts in the classroom.

Students also have access to laboratories featuring wind tunnels, a sound-proof acoustics testing chamber, and labs dedicated to work in fields like bio-signal analysis and electrodynamics.

Still Hall and Still Gym: The CEET Department of Technology is housed in the historic Still Hall and Still Gym. Opened in 1928, the buildings were among some of the first built on campus and originally housed a gymnasium, Industrial Arts Laboratories, classrooms, rooms for printing, book binding, metal work and mechanical drawing.

Today the buildings house 13 laboratories for students working on robotics, digital communications, plastics injection molding, pneumatics and hydraulics and rapid prototyping of mechanical parts. The buildings also include workshops for metal working and welding.

Computer Labs: Computer labs are located in each building.

Laboratories
CEET has 35 laboratories.

 Omron Robotics and Mechatronics Laboratory: In April 2013, the NIU College of Engineering and Engineering Technology unveiled its new Robotics and Mechatronics Laboratory, paid for and equipped by the Omron Foundation.
 Baxter Reliability Laboratory: The Baxter Reliability Laboratory is equipped to meet thermal, vibration and functional test requirements including a variety of product validation requirements, product robustness testing (HALT), electrical stress testing, and accelerated life testing. Additional Reliability functions provided include thermal analysis, reliability prediction, and warranty calculations.
 Advanced Research of Materials and Manufacturing Laboratory: 
Electrical Engineering
 Biomedical Engineering & Sensor Laboratory
 Digital Communications Laboratory
 Digital Signal Processing Laboratory
 General Computer Laboratory
 Electrodynamics Laboratory
 Integrated Circuit Design Laboratory
 Microelectronics Research & Development Laboratory
 Microwaves and Electromagnetics Laboratory
 Robotics and Intelligent Systems Laboratory
 Electrical Engineering Design Laboratory
 Undergraduate Laboratory

Industrial & Systems Engineering
 Ergonomics (Human Factors) Laboratory
 Lean Manufacturing Laboratory
 Logistics Laboratory
 Baxter Reliability Laboratory

Mechanical Engineering
 Advanced Research of Materials and Manufacturing Laboratory
 CAD/CAM Simulation and Fabrication Laboratory
 Omron Robotics & Mechatronics Laboratory
 Fluid Dynamics Laboratory
 Heat & Mass Transfer Laboratory
 Materials Analysis Laboratory
 Vibrations & Controls Laboratory
 Computerized Data Acquisition and Laboratory
 Macro/Micro Manufacturing Laboratory

Technology
 Automation/PLC Computer
 Digital and Communications Systems
 Fluid Power
 General Purpose Electronics
 Machining Technology
 Metrology
 Numerical Machining Laboratory (CNC)
 Plastics
 Power Systems Lab
 Prototyping
 Welding and Joining

Rankings
The NIU College of Engineering and Engineering Technology is ranked 46th in the nation for public engineering institutions where master's degrees are the highest degree offered (US News and World Report).

References

Northern Illinois University
Engineering schools and colleges in the United States
Engineering universities and colleges in Illinois
Educational institutions established in 1985
1985 establishments in Illinois